Solar power includes solar farms as well as local distributed generation, mostly on rooftops and increasingly from community solar  arrays. In 2021, utility-scale solar power generated 115 terawatt-hours (TWh), or 2.8% of electricity in the United States. Total solar generation that year, including estimated small-scale photovoltaic generation, was 164 TWh.

As of the end of 2021, the United States had 121 gigawatts (GW) of installed photovoltaic and concentrated solar power capacity combined. This capacity is exceeded only by China and the European Union. In 2021, 36% of all new electricity generation capacity in the country came from solar, surpassed only by wind with 41%. By 2015, solar employment had overtaken oil and gas as well as coal employment in the United States. In 2020, more than 230,000 Americans were employed in the solar industry.

The United States conducted much early research in photovoltaics and concentrated solar power. It is among the top countries in the world in electricity generated by the Sun and several of the world's largest utility-scale installations are located in the desert Southwest. The oldest solar power plant in the world is the 354-megawatt (MW) Solar Energy Generating Systems thermal power plant in California. The Ivanpah Solar Electric Generating System is a solar thermal power project in the Mojave Desert, 40 miles (64 km) southwest of Las Vegas, with a gross capacity of 392 MW. When commissioned it was the largest parabolic trough plant in the world and the first U.S. solar plant with molten salt thermal energy storage.

There are plans to build many other large solar plants in the United States. Many states have set individual renewable energy goals with solar power being included in various proportions. Hawaii plans 100% renewable-sourced electricity by 2045. Governor Jerry Brown has signed legislation requiring California's utilities to obtain 100 percent of their electricity from zero-carbon sources by the end of 2045 (including 60% renewable energy sources by 2030).

Solar potential 

A 2012 report from the National Renewable Energy Laboratory (NREL) described technically available renewable energy resources for each state and estimated that urban utility-scale photovoltaics could supply 2,232 TWh/year, rural utility-scale PV 280,613 TWh/year, rooftop PV 818 TWh/year, and CSP 116,146 TWh/year, for a total of almost 400,000 TWh/year, 100 times current consumption of 3,856 TWh in 2011.
For comparison, onshore wind potential is estimated at 32,784 TWh/year, and offshore wind at 16,976 TWh/year, while the total available from all renewable resources is estimated at 481,963 TWh/year.

Renewable energy is now the least cost source of power generation, which means the more solar, wind, and energy efficiency chosen over fossil fuels, the lower utility bills will be for everyone.  Securing financing for solar infrastructure in black and indigenous communities and communities of color can ensure the benefits of solar are available to all. Solar's material capacity has the potential to empower communities by allowing them to own and generate their own energy.

History 

Solar energy deployment increased at a record pace in the United States and throughout the world in 2008, according to industry reports. The Solar Energy Industries Association's "2008 U.S. Solar Industry Year in Review" found that U.S. solar energy capacity increased by 17% in 2007, reaching the total equivalent of 8,775 megawatts (MW). The SEIA report tallies all types of solar energy, and in 2007 the United States installed 342 MW of solar photovoltaic (PV) electric power, 139 thermal megawatts (MWth) of solar water heating, 762 MWth of pool heating, and 21 MWth of solar space heating and cooling.

Another report in 2008 by research and publishing firm Clean Edge and the nonprofit Co-op America found that solar power's contribution could grow to 10% of the nation's power needs by 2025, with nearly 2% of the nation's electricity coming from concentrating solar power systems, while solar photovoltaic systems would provide more than 8% of the nation's electricity.
Those figures correlate to nearly 50,000 megawatts of solar photovoltaic systems and more than 6,600 megawatts of concentrating solar power. The report noted that the cost per kilowatt-hour of solar photovoltaic systems had been dropping, while electricity generated from fossil fuels was becoming more expensive.
As a result, the report projects that solar power was expected to reach cost parity with conventional power sources in many U.S. markets by 2015.
To reach the 10% goal, solar photovoltaic companies would need to make solar power a "plug-and-play technology", or simplify the deployment of solar systems.
The report also underlines the importance of future "smart grid" technologies.

Solar Energy Industries Association and GTM Research found that the amount of new solar electric capacity increased in 2012 by 76 percent from 2011, raising the United States’ market share of the world's installations above 10 percent, up from roughly 5 to 7 percent in the past seven years.
According to the U.S. Energy Information Administration, as of September 2014 utility-scale solar had sent 12,303 gigawatt-hours of electricity to the U.S. grid. This was an increase of over 100% versus the same period in 2013 (6,048 GWh).
The number of homes with solar systems installed had been increasing rapidly; from 30,000 in 2006 to 1.3 million in 2016 with a study by the U.S. Department of Energy predicting the figure could reach 3.8 million homes by 2020.

In 2015 an article reported that utilities in the United States have led a largely unsuccessful campaign to slow the growth of solar.

Solar photovoltaic power

Solar PV installed capacity 

In the United States, 14,626 MW of PV was installed in 2016, a 95% increase over 2015 (7,493 MW).
During 2016, 22 states added at least 100 MW of capacity.
Just 4,751 MW of PV installations were completed in 2013. The U.S. had approximately 440 MW of off-grid photovoltaics as of the end of 2010. Through the end of 2005, a majority of photovoltaics in the United States was off-grid.

Solar is expected to account for 51 GW (or 48%) of the new installed generating capacity in the United States from 2022 to 2023.

Solar PV generation 

The amount of electricity a unit is capable of producing over an extended period of time is determined by multiplying the capacity by the capacity factor.
The capacity factor for solar photovoltaic units is largely a function of climate and latitude and so varies significantly from state to state.
The National Renewable Energy Laboratory has calculated that the highest statewide average solar voltaic capacity factors are in Arizona, New Mexico, and Nevada (each 26.3 percent), and the lowest is Alaska (10.5 percent).  The lowest statewide average capacity factor in the contiguous 48 states is in West Virginia (17.2 percent).

Solar power by type 

The table above gives an indication of the spread of solar power between the different types at the end of 2021. Capacity figures may seem smaller than those quoted by other sources and it is likely that the capacities are measured in MW AC rather than MW DC, the former of which gives a lower reading due to conversion losses during the process by which power is transformed by inverters from direct current to alternating current.

Large-scale PV facilities 

Large-scale photovoltaic power plants in the United States often consist of two or more units which correspond to construction stages and/or technology-improvement phases of a particular development project.  Typically these units are co-located in the vicinity of the same high-capacity transmission substation,  and may also feed that substation with other large PV plants which are adjacently sited but separately developed.  As of 2018, the ten largest operating plants in the United States, based on development grouping and total AC power capacity, are:

 The 579 megawatt (MWAC) Solar Star plant (Units I and II) in California was the world's largest photovoltaic power station when completed in 2015. It was superseded later that year by the Longyangxia Dam Solar Park in China.
 The Copper Mountain Solar Facility is a 882 MWAC solar power plant in Eldorado Valley, Nevada that consists of four units. Sempra Generation completed the first unit in 2010, and the latest came online in late 2016.
 The Topaz Solar Farm is a 550 MWAC photovoltaic power plant near San Luis Obispo County, California that has been fully operational since November 2014.
 The Desert Sunlight Solar Farm is a 550 MWAC solar power station located in the Sonoran Desert of California and completed in January 2015.
 The 460 MWAC Mount Signal Solar reached its current capacity when unit III came online in late 2018; the project will reach 600 MW when unit II is completed around 2020.
 The 400 MWAC Mesquite Solar project in Arizona consists of three units at the end of 2016 and is still being expanded.
 The Agua Caliente Solar Project is a 290 MWAC facility in Yuma County, Arizona operating at full capacity since April 2014.
 The California Flats Solar Project in Monterey County, California reached a capacity of 280 MWAC when a second unit came online at the end of 2018.
 The Springbok Solar Farm is a 260 MWAC facility in Kern County, California with two units completed. It is expected to reach 350 MW with completion of the third unit in 2019.
 At 250 MWAC each, there are five plants: McCoy Solar Energy Project, Silver State South Solar Project, California Valley Solar Ranch, Desert Stateline Solar Facility, and Moapa Southern Paiute Solar Project.

Distributed generation 
Within the cumulative PV capacity in the United States, there has been growth in the distributed generation segment, which are all grid-connected PV installations in the residential and non-residential markets. Non-residential market includes installations on commercial, government, school and non-profit organization properties.

Between 2000 and 2013 there was 2,261 MW of residential solar and 4,051 MW non-residential solar installed. After years of cost reduction, the average US price per watt was between $2.51 to $3.31 in 2020 for 10 kW systems, and $1.05/W for utility systems.

Another type of distributed generation implemented by a utility company was the world's first grid-connected pole-attached solar panels of Public Service Enterprise Group in New Jersey. More than 174,000 PV panels are mounted on utility poles along streets of New Jersey with aggregated capacity of 40 MW.

, there were nearly 5,500 schools in the United States that had solar installations with the total capacity of approximately 910 MW.  The top five states were Nevada, California, Hawaii, Arizona, and New Jersey with 23.10%, 14.50%, 14.50%, 14.10% and 13.00% of the schools in the respective states that had installations. , there were total capacity of 2,562 MW of commercial solar installations from more than 4,000 companies in 7,400 locations. Top five corporations were Target, Walmart, Prologis, Apple, and Kohl's.

Most households do not have access to photovoltaic rooftop solar for several reasons: because their roof may be shaded or oriented in the wrong direction; they may not own their roof as they are renters; or they may not have the financial capacity to afford rooftop solar. In the United States 18% solar adopters in 2018 earned below the national median household income, while 30% were below the median for owner-occupied households. However, as prices have rapidly dropped over the last 10 years, and business models have evolved to avoid upfront costs or high credit scores, rooftop solar is trending towards reaching more and more families of all incomes.

For households that cannot access solar on their own roofs, community solar is an option. Community solar allows customers to sign up for access to a shared solar array and receive bill credits on their monthly utility bill.  Community solar  is available in about one third of the states, including MN, NJ, CA, NY, MA and CO.

Solar cell manufacturing 

The American Recovery and Reinvestment Act of 2009 created a large investment into clean energy with the purpose of developing an increase of green jobs. Thin-film photovoltaics (CdTe and CIGS) were chosen because they can be less expensive to manufacture than crystalline silicon-based solar cells.

In late September 2008, Sanyo Electric Company, Ltd. announced its decision to build a manufacturing plant for solar ingots and wafers (the building blocks for silicon solar cells) in Salem, Oregon. The plant was scheduled to begin operating in October 2009 and scheduled to reach its full production capacity of 70 megawatts (MW) of solar wafers per year by April 2010. In April 2013 the plant closed its wafer slicing operation. In February 2016 the parent company, Panasonic, announced it would lay off 37% of the remaining workforce.
In early October 2008, First Solar, Inc. broke ground on an expansion of its Perrysburg, Ohio, planned to add enough capacity to produce another 57 MW per year of solar modules at the facility, bringing its total capacity to roughly 192 MW per year. In November 2016 the company reduced the workforce in the Perrysburg plant by 20% as part of a worldwide restructuring.
In mid-October 2008, SolarWorld AG opened a manufacturing plant in Hillsboro, Oregon. In 2016 the Hillsboro plant was the largest photovoltaic technology manufacturing plant in the Western Hemisphere. It maintains 500 megawatts of cell-manufacturing capacity and 350 MW of module-assembly capacity annually.

Rapidly decreasing photovoltaic prices put General Electric's planned factory in Colorado on hold, and led to the bankruptcy of Konarka Technologies, which had expected to produce 1,000 MW of solar modules per year by 2011, and Solyndra, which defaulted on a $535 million loan guarantee, prompting Republican members of the Energy and Commerce committee to vote to cease accepting new applications to the loan program.

In September 2014, SolarCity broke ground on a solar panel manufacturing plant in Buffalo, New York.
Upon its completion in 2016, it was projected to be the largest solar manufacturing facility in the Western hemisphere, with an annual manufacturing capacity of 1 gigawatt. However, as of 2019 the facility has not met the projections on production or job creation.

Disposal 
As cadmium, indium, selenium, nanoparticles, and other harmful elements are used in PV solar technology the disposal is similar to the outcomes of electronic waste. This can present possible risks for the workers disposing the product.

Concentrated solar power (CSP)

History 
One of the first applications of concentrated solar was the   solar powered motor made by H.E. Willsie and John Boyle in 1904.

An early solar pioneer of the 19th and 20th century, Frank Shuman, built a demonstration plant that used solar power to pump water using an array of mirrors in a trough to generate steam. After seven weeks of testing the plant was disassembled and shipped to Egypt for testing as an irrigation plant.

In 1973, Karl Böer of the University of Delaware built an experimental house called the Solar One, the first house to convert sunlight into energy.

Solar One, the first pilot solar power tower design was completed in 1981. The parabolic trough Solar Energy Generating Systems opened its first unit in 1984, the first major solar thermal plant in the world.

Selected list of plants 

The United States pioneered solar tower and trough technologies. A number of different solar thermal technologies are in use in the U.S.:

 The largest solar thermal power plant in the world is the 392 MW Ivanpah Solar Power Facility, in California. It deploys 173,500 heliostats each with two mirrors focusing solar energy on boilers located on centralized solar power towers. The facility opened on February 13, 2014.
When commissioned it was the largest parabolic trough plant in the world and the first U.S. solar plant with molten salt thermal energy storage. Built by the Spanish company Abengoa Solar, it has a total capacity of 280 megawatts (MW), which is enough to power 70,000 homes while avoiding around 475,000 tons of carbon dioxide. Its name is the Spanish term for "sunny spot".
 The Martin Next Generation Solar Energy Center is a hybrid 75 megawatt (MW) parabolic trough solar energy plant that is owned by Florida Power & Light Company (FPL). The solar plant is a component of the 3,705 MW Martin County Power Plant, which is currently the single largest fossil fuel burning power plant in the United States. Completed at the end of 2010, it is located in western Martin County, Florida, just north of Indiantown.

 The Mojave Solar Project is a 280 MW solar thermal power facility in the Mojave Desert in California, which was completed in December 2014.

The rapidly falling price of PV solar had led to several projects being abandoned or converted to PV technology. Blythe Solar Power Project converted to a PV project, Rice Solar Energy Project was put on indefinite hold, Palen Solar Project tried to convert to PV but its permits were denied, Hidden Hills Solar Project was suspended in 2013 and later canceled. No major CSP plants remain under construction in the United States.

CSP capacity and generation 
Abengoa's 280 MWac of CSP project was brought online in the 3rd quarter and Genesis Solar's first phase of 125 MWac was brought online in the 4th quarter of 2013 bringing the total to 410 MWac for the year and 918 MWac total. Ivanpah is already completed during the first quarter of 2014 the current world's largest CSP power plant is 392 MWac and brings the total to 1310 MWac.
The 110 MWac Crescent Dunes project started commissioning during February.
The 250 MWac Mojave solar, second phase 125 MWac Genesis Solar, and Tooele Army Depot Solar's 1.5 MWac power plant are all expected to come online in 2014. A total of around 9.5 GW of solar PV and CSP capacity is expected to come online in 2016, more than any other source.

 U.S. total numbers from 2016 onwards include utility-scale capacity only.

Government support 
A complete list of incentives is maintained at the Database of State Incentives for Renewable Energy (DSIRE).
Most solar power systems are grid connected and use net metering laws to receive compensation for electricity that is not consumed on site and exported to the grid.
New Jersey leads the nation with the least restrictive net metering law, and California leads in total number of homes which have solar panels installed. Many were installed because of the million solar roof initiative. In some states, such as Florida, solar power is subject to legal restrictions that discourage its use.

Federal 
The federal tax credit for solar was extended for eight years as part of the financial bail out bill, H.R. 1424, until the end of 2016. It was estimated this will create 440,000 jobs, 28 gigawatts of solar power, and lead to a $300 billion market for solar panels. This estimate did not take into account the removal of the $2,000 cap on residential tax credits at the end of 2008. A 30% tax credit is available for residential and commercial installations. For 2009 through 2011 this was a 30% grant, not a tax credit, known as the 1603 grant program.

The federal Residential Energy Efficient Property Credit (income tax credit on IRS Form 5695) for residential PV and solar thermal was extended in December 2015 to remain at 30% of system cost (parts and installation) for systems put into service by the end of 2019, then 26% until the end of 2020, and then 22% until the end of 2021. It applies to a taxpayer's principal and/or second residences, but not to a property that is rented out. There is no maximum cap on the credit, and the credit can be applied toward the Alternative Minimum Tax, and any excess credit (greater than that year's tax liability) can be rolled into the following year. The solar industry and utilities clashed extensively on renewal, but the solar industry prevailed. The renewal is expected to add $38 billion of investment for 20 GigaWatts of solar.

Section 1603 grants 
President Obama's stimulus bill in 2009 created a program known as Section 1603 grants. The program was designed to give federal grants to solar companies for 30 percent of investments into solar energy. Since 2009, the federal government has given solar companies $25 billion in grant money through this program. The Section 1603 grant program expired in 2011.

On June 9, 2016, Senator Orrin Hatch requested from Department of Treasury, the Internal Revenue Service (IRS) and the Treasury Inspector General for Tax Administration (TIGTA) details about how companies use Section 1603 grants and tax credits. In March 2016, Hatch asked the IRS and Treasury Department to demonstrate that the agencies use safeguards and coordinate with each other when reviewing applications for Section 1603 grants.

Solar America Initiative 

The United States Department of Energy (DOE) announced on September 29, 2008 that it will invest $17.6 million, subject to annual appropriations, in six company-led, early-stage photovoltaic (PV) projects under the Solar America Initiative's "PV Incubator" funding opportunity, designed to fund prototype PV components and systems with the goal of moving them through the commercialization process by 2010 and make it cost-competitive with conventional forms of electricity by 2015 (grid parity).

SunShot Initiative 
The SunShot Initiative aimed to reduce the cost of solar power by 75% from 2010 to 2020. The name is based on "moon shot", Kennedy's target of reaching the moon within the decade.

Goals:

 Residential system prices reduced from $6/W to $1.50/W
 Commercial system prices reduced from $5/W to $1.25/W
 Utility-scale system prices reduced from $4/W to $1.00/W (CSP, CPV and PV)

Trump administration 
In 2018, as part of a trade war between the U.S. and China, US President Trump imposed tariffs on imported solar cells. The push for tariffs to protect American manufacturing and jobs in the solar power industry began in April 2017, when a bankrupt Georgia-based solar cell maker filed a trade complaint that a flood of cheap imports put them at a severe disadvantage. In response, the President imposed 30% tariffs of solar imports in January 2018. The solar industry is currently one of the fastest growing in the United States, employing more than 250,000 people as of 2018. On one hand, these tariffs forced the cancellation or scaling down of many projects and restrict the ability of companies to recruit more workers. On the other hand, they have the intended effect of incentivizing domestic manufacturing. Many solar power companies are transitioning towards automation and consequently will become less dependent on imports, especially from China.  Analysts believe Trump's tariffs have made a clear impact. Without them, the manufacturing capacity for solar cells in the United States would likely not have increased significantly, from 1.8 gigawatts in 2017 to at least 3.4 gigawatts in 2018, they argue. However, because of the increasing reliance on automation, not that many new jobs will be created, while profits will flow to other countries, as many firms are foreign. By 2019, the solar power industry has recovered from the initial setbacks due to Trump's tariffs, thanks to initiatives from various states, such as California. Moreover, it is receiving considerable support from the Department of Energy. The National Renewable Energy Laboratory (NREL) launched the "American-made Solar Prize" competition in June 2018 and has handed out tens to hundreds of thousand of dollars in cash prizes for the most promising solar cell designs. Prices of solar cells continue to decline.

Biden administration 
In 2022, President Biden extended the now 15% tariff on solar panels another four years.

State and local

State initiatives 

 Governor Jerry Brown signed legislation requiring California's utilities to get 50 percent of their electricity from renewable energy sources by the end of 2030.
 The San Francisco Board of Supervisors passed solar incentives of up to $6,000 for homeowners and up to $10,000 for businesses. Applications for the program began on July 1, 2008. in April 2016, they passed a law requiring all new buildings below 10 stories to have rooftop solar panels, making it the first major U.S. city to do so
 In 2008, Berkeley initiated a revolutionary pilot program where homeowners are able to add the cost of solar panels to their property tax assessment, and pay for them out of their electricity cost savings. In 2009, more than a dozen states passed legislation allowing property tax financing. In all, 27 states offer loans for solar projects (though after the conclusion of the pilot program, due to issues with Fannie Mae and Freddie Mac, Berkeley no longer offers this financing mechanism).
 The California Solar Initiative has set a goal to create 3,000 megawatts of new, solar-produced electricity by 2016.
 New Hampshire has a $3,750 residential rebate program for up to 50% of system cost for systems less than 5 kWp ($6,000 from July 1, 2008 until 2010).
 Louisiana has a 50 percent tax credit up to $12,500 for the installation of a wind or solar system.
 New Jersey law provides new solar power installations with exemptions from the 7% state sales tax, and from any increase in property assessment (local property tax increases), subject to certain registration requirements.
 Massachusetts has multiple incentives to encourage solar power. New MA residential solar arrays are eligible for a 15% State tax credit up to $1000, a solar Sales Tax exemption, and a solar Property Tax exemption. The Solar Massachusetts Renewable Target (SMART) Plan is also available to solar installations until 2022 based on the customer's utility.

Feed-in tariffs 
Experience has demonstrated that a feed-in tariff is both the least expensive and the most effective means of developing solar power. Investors need certainty, which they receive from a feed-in tariff. California enacted a feed-in tariff which began on February 14, 2008. Washington state has a feed-in tariff of 15 ¢/kWh which increases to 54 ¢/kWh if components are manufactured in the state. Hawaii, Michigan, and Vermont also have feed in tariffs. In 2010, the Federal Energy Regulatory Commission (FERC) ruled that states were able to implement above-market feed-in tariffs for specific technologies.

In 2012 the U.S. Department of Commerce placed a 31% tariff on solar cells made in China. In 2018, the Trump administration placed a 30% tariff on all imported solar equipment.

Solar renewable energy certificates 
In recent years, states that have passed Renewable Portfolio Standard (RPS) or Renewable Electricity Standard (RES) laws have relied on the use of solar renewable energy certificates (SRECs) to meet state requirements. This is done by adding a specific solar carve-out to the state Renewable Portfolio Standard (RPS). The first SREC program was implemented in 2005 by the state of New Jersey and has since expanded to several other states, including Maryland, Delaware, Ohio, Massachusetts, North Carolina and Pennsylvania.

An SREC program is an alternative to the feed-in tariff model popular in Europe. The key difference between the two models is the market-based mechanism that drives the value of the SRECs, and therefore the value of the subsidy for solar. In a feed-in tariff model, the government sets the value for the electricity produced by a solar facility. If the level is higher, more solar power is built and the program is more costly. If the feed-in tariff is set lower, less solar power is built and the program is ineffective. The problem with SRECs is a lack of certainty for investors. A feed-in tariff provides a known return on investment, while an SREC program provides a possible return on investment.

Power purchase agreements 
In 2006 investors began offering free solar panel installation in return for a 25-year contract, or power purchase agreement, to purchase electricity at a fixed price, normally set at or below current electric rates. By 2009 over 90% of commercial photovoltaics installed in the United States were installed using a power purchase agreement. Approximately 90% of the photovoltaics installed in the United States is in states that specifically address power purchase agreements.

New construction mandates 
In March 2013, Lancaster, California became the first U.S. city to mandate the inclusion of solar panels on new homes, requiring that "every new housing development must average 1 kilowatt per house."

PACE 

An innovative financing arrangement pioneered in Berkeley, California, and Palm Springs, lends money to a homeowner for a solar system, to be repaid via an additional tax assessment on the property for 20 years.  This allows installation of the solar system at "relatively little up-front cost to the property owner." Now known as PACE, for Property Assessed Clean Energy, it is available in 28 states. Freddie Mac and Fannie Mae have objected to the repayment of solar loans being senior to mortgage loans, and some states have relegated PACE loans to junior loans. HR 2599 was introduced to prevent interference with the PACE program by other lenders. The principal feature of the program is that the balance of the loan is transferred to the new owners in the event the property is sold, and the loan is paid for entirely through electric bill savings. Unlike a mortgage loan, no funds are transferred when the property is sold – only the repayment obligation is transferred. PACE programs are currently operating in eight states, California, Colorado, Florida, Maine, Michigan, Missouri, New York, and Wisconsin, and are on hold in many others, pending resolution of the Freddie Mac, Fannie Mae objection.

Generation (PV and CSP) 

Source: NREL, EIA;
NREL includes distributed generation, EIA, including the monthly data above, includes only utility-scale generation. "EIA util % of total" is the percentage of all electricity produced at utility-scale facilities that is generated by utility-scale solar.

See also 

 American Solar Energy Society
 Biofuel in the United States
 Electricity sector of the United States
 Energy in the United States
 Geothermal energy in the United States
 Hydroelectric power in the United States
 List of photovoltaics companies
 List of renewable energy topics by country and territory
 Renewable energy in the United States
 Wind power in the United States

References

Further reading 

 GA Mansoori, N Enayati, LB Agyarko (2016), Energy: Sources, Utilization, Legislation, Sustainability, Illinois as Model State, World Sci. Pub. Co.,  Clean Tech Nation: How the U.S. Can Lead in the New Global Economy (2012) by Ron Pernick and Clint Wilder
 Deploying Renewables 2011 (2011) by the International Energy Agency
 Reinventing Fire: Bold Business Solutions for the New Energy Era (2011) by Amory Lovins
 Renewable Energy Sources and Climate Change Mitigation (2011) by the IPCC
 Solar Energy Perspectives'' (2011) by the International Energy Agency

External links 

 
 
 Solar panels on the White House.
 Study: Solar Power Could Provide 10% of U.S. Electricity by 2025
 Sensitivity of Utility-Scale Solar Deployment Projections in the Sunshot Vision Study to Market and Performance Assumptions National Renewable Energy Laboratory
 The Database of State Incentives for Renewable Energy (DSIRE)
 Live monitoring of over 1400 solar installations
 Bureau of Land Management 2012 Renewable Energy Priority Projects
 Maps of approved solar energy zones in USA, additional mapping
 United States cloud coverage
 IRS Form 5695 – Residential Energy Credits and instructions
 Solar maps: NREL annual and monthly (CSP and PV), U.S. installations